is a Japanese manga series written and illustrated by Kenta Shinohara. It was serialized online from May 2016 to December 2017 via Shueisha's Shōnen Jump+ website/app. It was collected in five tankōbon volume. Viz Media published the series in English. An anime television series adaptation by Lerche aired from July to September 2019.

Plot
In 2063, space travel has become possible and commercially viable; a group of students from Caird High School departs to the nearby planet of McPa for their Planetary Camp. Soon after the group arrives on the planet, the nine children encounter a mysterious and unforeseen intelligent sphere of light; it attacks them, transporting them into the distant depths of space. Floating in orbit around an unknown planet, they discover an old abandoned spacecraft nearby. Finding it in working order, they resolve to use the ship to return home. To do so, they must cross the 5,012-light-year gulf of space separating them from home by visiting alien planets (the names of which are all anagrams) harboring life to replenish and manage their limited resources.

The long and dangerous journey home aboard their vessel, which they name Astra, brings with it new character revelations, strengthening the bonds they share, and the eventual realization that the stakes of their journey are far higher than any of them could ever have realized.

Characters

An optimistic guy with good athletic ability and captain in the Astra ship. While he has interest about space thanks to his now-deceased teacher, his father forced him to take a part in athletic activity. His lifelong dream is to be able to explore outer space while captaining his own ship. Later on, he loses his right arm as a result of an altercation with Charce. At the end of the series, he proposes marriage to Aries.

Aries sometimes acts like an airhead and sometimes has flashes of inspiration. She also has an eidetic memory. While her eyes are both green, her left eye color is slightly pale compared to the right one. She transferred to the school only a month before the trip. It is revealed that she is the thought dead clone of the recently murdered princess of Vixia, the princess was not happy about being cloned and was even more upset about the fate of her clone that she secretly ordered her handmaiden to take the baby far away from Vixia and raise her to have a normal life, telling her father that Aries died of a disease. Lastly, the princess named the baby after herself by simply reversing the letters of her first name.

A naturally curious boy and a talented engineer capable of repairing any damage to the Astra. His father Marco is a controversial senator. Later it turns out that Luca is intersex, having an androgynous body with sexual characteristics of both sexes. Although he identifies himself as a boy, Luca notes that he does not really consider himself a man or a woman, and his identity can change. It is revealed that Luca was adopted by the senator and the senator knew that Luca was a clone of a famous artist. 

A handsome, intelligent student botanist who uses his cooking and botany skills to ensure the crew is properly fed. Acts as Kanata's first mate. Charce is in reality actually a member of the royal family of Vixia, sent to assassinate everyone utilizing a wormhole. However, upon meeting Aries and noticing her unique traits, he became convinced that she was a clone of his childhood friend, Seira, and so changed his plan to bring her back alive. It is revealed that he is the clone of the King of Vixia and that he already knew that secret. At the end of the series, he becomes King of Vixia and orders the tearing down of its capital's walls.

A rich heiress who is the daughter of a famous doctor. She finds it difficult to trust other people besides Zack, who is her childhood friend. She received very little attention from her mother. As a teenager during the 113 days in space she was the Astra's ship "doctor". At the end of the series, she and Zack get married. 

A cool and intelligent student who seeks to become a space explorer and has a space pilot license, making him the Astra's main pilot. His father works in the bio-technology industry who is currently working on a project with Quitterie's mother, thus making Quitterie and him childhood friends. His dream is to pilot his own ship with Kanata captaining. 

Goes by the nickname Funi, she is Quitterie's adopted sister, who was adopted into the family after the death of her parents. She is a cheerful, positive girl who wants to get along with Quitterie. She carries around a puppet named Beego with her. It is revealed that she is actually a clone of Quitterie, thus making her a spare clone for their mother. At the end of the series, she is seen dressed in Quitterie's old clothes initially talking to Paulina and Ulgar outside of school then attending Yun-Hua's concert with her sister, Aries and Luca.

A quiet, antisocial, but highly intelligent boy who does not get along well with the rest of the crew. His father is the vice-principal of Caird High. He is good at handling a gun. His late older brother was a freelance journalist who stumbled upon a secret he should not have which resulted in his death, leading Ulgar to despise and hold revenge against Marco Esposito. At the end of the series he follows his brother's footsteps, becoming a freelance journalist.

A shy, quiet girl who constantly apologizes for everything she does as a result of being emotionally suppressed by her mother, Lucy Lum, a world famous singer. Yun-Hua has a great singing voice, but her mother constantly berated her and told her she should not bring attention to herself, so she distanced herself as much as possible. After a talk with Kanata as well as everyone else nearly dying of poisonous pollen, she reveals why she is so shy, eventually she has Luca give her a haircut and she starts coming out of her shell. At the end of the series, she becomes a popular singer herself.

A woman whom the crew of the Astra discovers has been in cryosleep for 12 years on a ship of a similar but older model than the Astra. Her allies were killed, leaving her the only survivor of her crew. They were members of a planetary exploration team looking for other habitable planets. After it is revealed that the timeline was shifted 100 years, she realized that she actually was asleep for 112 years. At the end of the series she becomes a teacher at Funicia's school and that she is 36 years old without factoring in the years in  cryosleep.

Media

Manga
Astra Lost in Space, written and illustrated by Kenta Shinohara, was serialized on Shueisha's digital magazine app and website Shōnen Jump+ from May 9, 2016, to December 30, 2017. Shueisha collected its chapters in five tankōbon volumes, released from July 4, 2016, to February 2, 2018.

In North America, the manga was licensed for English release by Viz Media.

Volume list

Anime
An anime television series adaptation was announced on February 5, 2019. The series was animated by Lerche and directed by Masaomi Andō, with Norimitsu Kaihō handling series composition, and Keiko Kurosawa designing the characters. Masaru Yokoyama and Nobuaki Nobusawa composed the series' music. It aired from July 3 to September 18, 2019, on AT-X, Tokyo MX, TVA, KBS, SUN, and BS11. The first and last episodes aired as one-hour specials. Nonoc performed the series' opening theme song "star*frost", while the ending theme, "Glow at the Velocity of Light", was performed by Riko Azuna. Funimation licensed the series in North America and the British Isles, and streamed it in both subtitled and dubbed formats.

Episode list

Reception
The manga was ranked third in the 2019 edition of Takarajimasha's Kono Manga ga Sugoi! guidebook and won the twelfth Manga Taishō Awards. It was also nominated for the 23rd Tezuka Osamu Cultural Prize. The anime adaptation won "Best Media" at the 51st Seiun Award during the 59th Nihon SF Taikai.

Michele Liu of Anime News Network said that the series is "unique" because Luca is a main character who is born intersex rather than "altered by sci-fi space diseases or external influence," with Liu also describing Luca as bisexual.

Notes

References

External links
  
 

2019 anime television series debuts
Anime series based on manga
AT-X (TV network) original programming
Comics about cloning
Crunchyroll anime
Japanese webcomics
Lerche (studio)
Manga Taishō
Medialink
Shōnen manga
Shueisha manga
Space adventure television series
Space opera anime and manga
Television series about cloning
Transgender in anime and manga
Viz Media manga
Webcomics in print